The 1931 Texas Mines Miners football team was an American football team that represented Texas School of Mines (now known as the University of Texas at El Paso) as an independent during the 1931 college football season. In its third season under head coach Mack Saxon, the team compiled a 7–1 record and outscored opponents by a total of 136 to 84.

Schedule

References

Texas Mines
UTEP Miners football seasons
Texas Mines Miners football